Röa is a village in Rapla Parish, Rapla County, Estonia.

References

 

Villages in Rapla County